The Azalea class of twelve minesweeping sloops were built under the Emergency War Programme for the Royal Navy in World War I as part of the larger , which were also referred to as the Cabbage class, or "Herbaceous Borders". The third batch of twelve ships to be ordered in May 1915, they differed from the preceding  only in mounting a heavier armament. One ship, converted to a Q-ship was lost during the war, another during the Allied intervention in the Russian Civil War in 1919. With the exception of two others, the rest were scrapped. One entered mercantile service, while the other was transferred to the Belgian Navy. Both were captured by the Germans during World War II and put into German service. One was lost with the final ship being scrapped in 1952

Design and description
The Azaleas were a series of twelve minesweeping sloops that were designed to operate as minesweepers with the fleet at the beginning of World War I. A shortage of this type required their quick construction. Their hulls were built to a simplified design in order to speed construction and were built under Lloyd's survey instead of normal naval requirements. The hull of the ships have flare but lack sheer and the forecastle extending to just abaft the foremast. The vessels had a triple hull at the bow to give extra protection against loss when working. Their appearance was marked by widely spread masts, bridge and two funnels. However, they also acted as dispatch vessels or carrying out towing operations, but as the war continued and the threat from German submarines grew, became increasingly involved in anti-submarine duties.

The Azaleas were propelled by a single propeller connected by a single shaft to a 4-cylinder triple expansion engine powered by steam from two cylindrical boilers creating . Their single screw gave them a wide turning circle.

The sloops were designed to be armed with two single-mounted QF  low-angle guns as protection against German raids on the minesweeping flotillas. However, late in production, some of the vessels were given QF  guns. For anti-aircraft (AA) defence, the Azaleas mounted two by single 3-pounder (47 mm) AA guns. The complement of the vessels ranged from 79 to 80 officers and ratings.

Ships of the class

Construction and career
Officially termed "Fleet Sweeping Vessels (Sloops)" by the Royal Navy, the Azalea-class ships were intended to built quickly and were designed to merchant vessel construction parameters so they could be constructed in non-naval shipyards. They were primarily intended for minesweeping duties but were adapted to various other duties throughout the war. They had an average construction period of 25 weeks. The Azaleas were ordered in May 1915 as part of the War Emergency Programme and entered service between September and December 1915. One, Begonia was converted to a Q-ship at Haulbowline, Ireland in 1916–1917 to resemble a small coastal trading vessel. Aside from Begonia, the rest of the class survived the war, with the majority sent for scrapping after the war in the early 1920s. Two, Peony and Zinnia continued in service. Another, Myrtle, was mined in 1919 during Royal Navy operations in the Baltic Sea as part of the Allied intervention in the Russian Civil War. 

Peony was sold into mercantile service, converted to a passenger ferry and renamed Ardena. The ferry was used on the routes between Cherbourg and Caen. Ardena continued in service into World War II, where the vessel was sunk by the Luftwaffe in 1941 before being raised by the Germans and put back into service. On 28 September 1943 she was sailing from Cephalonia to Greece with 840 Italian prisoners of war when Ardena struck a mine and sank.

Zinnia was transferred to Belgium on 19 April 1920 and used for fishery protection duties by the new Royal Belgian Navy. In 1927, the Belgian Navy was disbanded and Zinnia was manned by civilians. In 1940, the vessel was captured by the Germans and was rebuilt at Antwerp for service with the Kriegsmarine as the now renamed Barbara. Barbara survived the war and was returned to the Belgians following it. Renamed Breydel, the vessel was scrapped in 1952.

Notes

Citations

References

External links

  Transcription of ship's logbooks and weather information

 
Sloop classes